The Women's 2021 Allam British Open was the women's edition of the 2021 British Open Squash Championships, which is a 2020–21 PSA World Tour event. The event took place at the Sports Complex at the University of Hull in Hull in England between August 16 and 22, 2021. The event was sponsored by Dr Assem Allam.

The event was arranged for June instead of May because of the COVID-19 pandemic in the United Kingdom and then rearranged for August. The 2020 event had also been cancelled due to the pandemic.

Nour El Sherbini defeated Nouran Gohar in an all Egyptian final, which saw Nour El Sherbini winning the title for the third time.

Seeds

Draw and results

Semi-finals and final

Main Draw

Top half

Bottom half

See also
2021 Men's British Open Squash Championship

References

Women's British Open
Women's British Open
British Open Squash
Women's British Open Squash Championships
Women's sport in the United Kingdom
Sport in Kingston upon Hull
Squash in England
2020s in Kingston upon Hull